The Fashion and Textile Museum is the only museum in the UK dedicated to showcasing contemporary fashion and textile design. The museum is committed to presenting varied, creative and engaging exhibitions, alongside an exciting selection of educational courses, talks, events and workshops. In place of a permanent collection is a diverse programme of temporary exhibitions, displaying a broad range of innovative fashion and textiles from designers and makers around the world.

The Fashion and Textile Museum was founded by in 2003, by icon of British design, Dame Zandra Rhodes. Today, the museum is operated by Newham College, London – one of Europe's largest further education colleges. Situated in the heart of fashionable Bermondsey Village, the museum is housed in a beautiful and distinctive building, designed by renowned Mexican architect, Ricardo Legorreta.

Building
The museum is housed in a converted warehouse which was redesigned by the Mexican architect Ricardo Legorreta in collaboration with Dame Zandra Rhodes. It was Legorreta's first and only building in Europe. In addition to the exhibition space, the building contains a textile studio and printing workshop and private residential quarters. The building has become a tourist attraction in its own right due to its colour scheme of hot pink, burnt orange, yellow, and bright blue.

Exhibitions

Current exhibition

 Kaffe Fassett: The Power of Pattern - 23 September 2022 – 12 March 2023

Future exhibitions 

 Andy Warhol: The Textiles - 31 March – 10 September 2023

Past exhibitions

150 Years of the Royal School of Needlework: Crown to Catwalk -  1 April – 4 September 2022
Beautiful People: The Boutique in 1960s Counterculture - 3 September 2021 – January 2022
Annie Phillips: Ancient Technique and Contemporary Art - 18 May – 12 September 2021
Chintz: Cotton in Bloom - 18 May – 12 September 2021
Out of the Blue: Fifty Years of Designers Guild - 14 February 2020 – 21 February 2021

 Zandra Rhodes: 50 Years of Fabulous - 27 September 2019 – 26 January 2020
 Norman Hartnell – A Tribute - 27 September 2019 – 26 January 2020
 Weavers of the Clouds: Textile Arts of Peru - 21 June – 8 September 2019
 Will You Be My Valentine? Works by Natalie Gibson - 8 February – 2 June 2019
 Swinging London: A Lifestyle Revolution | Terence Conran – Mary Quant - 8 February – 2 June 2019
 Elizabeth Suter: Sharp Lines and Swift Sketches - 8 February – 2 June 2019
 Night and Day: 1930s Fashion and Photographs - 12 October 2018 – 20 January 2019
 Cecil Beaton: Thirty from the 30s – Fashion, Film and Fantasy - 12 October 2018 – 20 January 2019
Orla Kiely: A Life in Pattern - 25 May – 23 September 2018
T-Shirt: Cult – Culture – Subversion  –  9 February 2018 – 6 May 2018
T: The Typology of The T-Shirt - 9 February – 6 May 2018
The Secret Life of Scissors - 9 February – 6 May 2018
Harper's Bazaar 150 Years – The Greatest Moments – 20 October 2017 – 21 January 2018
 Wallace Sewell: 25 Years of British Textile Design –  20 October 2017 – 21 January 2018
 Louise Dahl-Wolfe: A Style of Her Own – 20 October 2017 – 21 January 2018
The World of Anna Sui – 26 May – 1 October 2017
Festival of Textiles 2017 - 28 January – 7 May 2017
Josef Frank Patterns–Furniture–Painting – 28 January – 7 May 2017
Full Circle & Recycle: 21st Century Swedish Textiles - 28 January – 7 May 2017
Gudrun Sjödén: Four Decades of Colour & Design - 25 April – 7 May 2017
 1920s Jazz Age Fashion & Photographs – 23 September 2016 – 15 January 2017
 James Abbe: Photographer of the Jazz Age - 23 September 2016 – 15 January 2017
 London Design Festival: New Artist Textiles from Canada - 16–18 September 2016
 London Fashion Foundation Show - 16–18 September 2016
Missoni Art Colour – 6 May – 4 September 2016
Festival of Textiles 2016 - 11 March – 17 April 2016
Art Textiles: Marian Clayden - 11 March – 17 April 2016
 Liberty in Fashion – 9 October 2015 – 28 February 2016
 The Art of Pattern - 9 October 2015 – 28 February 2016
 Rayne: Shoes for Stars - 22 May – 13 September 2015
Riviera Style: Resort and Swimwear Style Since 1900 – 22 May 2015 – 30 August 2015 (in partnership with King and McGaw)
A Journey to the Riviera - 22 May – 13 September 2015
Nautical Chic by Amber Jane Butchart - 22 May – 27 August 2015
Thea Porter: 70s Bohemian Chic - 6 February – 3 May 2015
Mirror Man: Andrew Logan Portraits - 6 February – 3 May 2015
Knitwear: From Chanel to Westwood – 19 September 2014 – 18 January 2015
How to Draw Vintage Fashion -  19 September 2014 – 18 January 2015
PATTERN: Watts’ Architect Wallpapers 1870 to today - 19 September 2014 – 18 January 2015 
Knitwear in Fashion Photography - 19 September 2014 – 18 January 2015
Visionary Knitwear - 19 September 2014 – 18 January 2015
El Intercambio Cultural/A Cultural Exchange - 6 June – 31 August 2014
Made in Mexico: The Rebozo in Art, Culture & Fashion - 6 June – 31 August 2014
Artist Textiles: Picasso to Warhol - 31 January – 18 May 2014
Sarah Campbell ‘from start to finish’ - 31 January – 17 May 2014
The Glamour of Bellville Sassoon - 20 September 2013 – 11 January 2014
Zandra Rhodes: Unseen - 12 July – 31 August 2013
 Designing Women: Post-war British Textiles 16 March 2012 – 16 June 2012
 The Printed Square – Vintage Handkerchiefs – 22 March 2012 – 16 June 2012
 Kaffe Fassett: A Life in Colour - 22 March – 29 June 2013
 Hartnell to Amies: Couture By Royal Appointment - 16 November 2012 – 23 February 2013
 POP! Culture and Fashion 1955–1976 – 6 July 2012 – 27 October 2012
 Designing Women: Post-War British Textiles - 16 March – 16 June 2012
 Catwalk to Cover – A Front Row Seat - 18 November 2011 – 25 February 2012
Tommy Nutter: Rebel on the Row – 20 May 2011 – 22 October 2011
Sue Timney and the design of Timney-Fowler – 16 November 2010 – 25 April 2011
Horrockses Fashions: Off the Peg Style in the '40s and '50s – 9 July 2010 – 24 October 2010
 30 years of Pineapple by Debbie Moore – 18 January 2010 – 24 February 2010
 Very Sanderson – 150 Years of English Decoration - 19 March – 13 June 2010
Foale and Tuffin – Made in England – 23 October 2009 – 24 February 2010
 Undercover: The Evolution of Underwear – 12 June 2009 – 27 September 2009
Swedish Fashion: Exploring A New Identity – 6 February 2009 – 17 May 2009
 Billy: Bill Gibb's Moment in Time – 24 October 2008 – 18 January 2009
Little Black Dress – 20 June 2008 – 25 August 2008
 Peacocks and Pinstripes – 8 February 2008 – 31 May 2008

See also
Fashion museum
Textile museum

References

External links 

 

Textile museums in the United Kingdom
Fashion museums in the United Kingdom
Museums in the London Borough of Southwark
Bermondsey
Museums established in 2003
2003 establishments in England
Ricardo Legorreta buildings